The McDonald's Monopoly game is a sales promotion run by fast food restaurant chain McDonald's, with a theme based on the Hasbro board game Monopoly. The game first ran in the U.S. in 1987 and has since been used worldwide.

The promotion has used other names, such as Monopoly: Pick Your Prize! (2001), Monopoly Best Chance Game (2003–2005), Monopoly/Millionaire Game, Prize Vault (2013–2014), Money Monopoly (2016–present), Coast To Coast (2015–present) in Canada, Golden Chances (2015), Prize Choice (2016), Win Win (2017), Wiiiin!! (2018), V.I.P. (2021) and Double Peel (2022–present) in the UK.

History
The promotion has been offered in the United States, Canada, Australia, Austria, France, Germany, Hong Kong, the Netherlands, New Zealand, Poland, Portugal, Romania, Russia, Singapore, South Africa, Spain, Switzerland, Taiwan, and United Kingdom since 1987. Argentina and Brazil were included in 2013 as well as South Korea in 2014 and Ireland in 2016. From 2003 to 2009, Best Buy was involved in the U.S. version, and later in the Canadian version.

Like many merchants, McDonald's offered sweepstakes to draw customers into its restaurants. Laws generally forbid a company from administering its own contests, in order to prevent fraud and to ensure that all prizes are given away; as a result, such promotions are handled by an impartial third-party company. McDonald's had a relationship with Simon Worldwide Inc., which was responsible for the distribution of the contest pieces and the awarding of major prizes.

In 2015, the Monopoly game was replaced in the US by "Game Time Gold", using an NFL theme.

In 2020, in the UK, it was intended to run in March that year, but due to the COVID-19 pandemic, the promotion was postponed. Instead, the same promotion "Monopoly VIP" was instead run in 2021. As a result of it being postponed, the stickers for that year's promotion had incorrect dates, as they were originally printed the year prior.

Fraud
In 2001, the U.S. promotion was halted after fraud was uncovered. A subcontracting company, Simon Marketing (then a subsidiary of Cyrk), which had been hired by McDonald's to organize and promote the game, failed to recognize a flaw in its procedures. Chief of security Jerome P. Jacobson ("uncle Jerry", former police officer) was able to remove the most valuable game pieces, which he then passed to associates who would redeem them and share the proceeds. Jacobson justified his long-running multi-million-dollar crime as being his reaction to executives re-running randomized draws to ensure high-level prizes went to areas in the United States rather than Canadathough he did not take the stolen pieces to Canada to rectify this supposed problem, choosing instead to personally gain by selling the pieces. He began stealing winning game pieces after a supplier mistakenly provided him a sheet of the anti-tamper seals needed to secretly make the swap. Jacobson sold winning pieces for a percentage of the winnings in advance, initially to friends and family but expanding nationwide after a chance meeting in the Atlanta airport between him and Gennaro "Jerry" Colombo of the Colombo crime family.

In 1995, Colombo appeared in a nationally televised McDonald's commercial promoting his (fraudulent) win of a Dodge Viper. In 1995, St. Jude Children's Hospital in Memphis, Tennessee, received an anonymous letter postmarked Dallas, Texas, which contained a $1 million winning game piece. Game rules prohibited the transfer of prizes, but McDonald's chose to follow through by treating the $1 million as a donation to the hospital, making the final $50,000 annuity payment in 2014. Investigations later indicated that Jacobson had admitted to sending the winning piece to the hospital. In June 1996, Colombo's father-in-law, William "Buddy" Fisher, cashed in a stolen $1 million Monopoly piece. Jerry Colombo died in a traffic accident in 1998, so Jacobson found new accomplices to help him sell the stolen winning prize tabs.

Jacobson's associates won almost all of the top prizes, including cash and cars, between 1995 and 2000, including McDonald's giveaways that did not have the Monopoly theme ("Hatch, Match, and Win," "When the USA Wins, You Win," "Disney's Masterpiece Collection Trivia Challenge at McDonald's," "Who Wants to be a Millionaire Game," "Win on the Spot", to name a few). The associates netted over $24 million. While the fraud appeared to have been perpetrated by only one key employee of the promotion company, and not by the company's management, eight people were originally arrested, soon growing to 21 indicted individuals, with members of the Colombo crime family believed to have been involved in the fraud at some point. By the end of criminal prosecutions, 53 people were indicted, of whom 48 pled guilty46 in pre-trial plea agreements, while two others changed their plea from not guilty to guilty during their trials.

The relationship between McDonald's and Simon Marketing broke down in a pair of lawsuits over breach of contract, eventually settled out of court, with the claim of McDonald's being thrown out and Simon receiving $16.6 million. Four of the "winners" convicted of fraud had their convictions reversed on appeal due to a constitutional violation, by which it was confirmed that they did not know Jacobson and thus did not know that the winning game pieces oddly given to them by Jacobson's recruiters were necessarily stolen.

Jacobson pleaded guilty to three counts of mail fraud in federal court in Jacksonville, Florida, and served three years in federal prison. The trial began on September 10, 2001, but was overshadowed in the media by the September 11 attacks which occurred the next day.

In August 2018, 20th Century Fox announced plans for a film based on the Jacobson fraud, with Ben Affleck then attached as director, Paul Wernick and Rhett Reese as writers, and Matt Damon in an acting role. While there have been no further updates on the plans for the film, the controversy is depicted in the 2020 HBO docuseries McMillions.

Gameplay

The promotion mimics the game Monopoly. The game is also advertised with tokens appearing in Sunday newspapers. Originally, customers received a set of two tokens with every purchase, but now tokens come only with certain menu items. Tokens correspond to a property space on the Monopoly board (with the exception of the Golden Avenue/Arches Avenue "properties", which were added in the 2008 edition; and Electric Company/Water Works utilities added in 2014). When combined into color-matched properties, the tokens may be redeemed for money. Historically, the grand prize ($1 million, annuity only) has been the combination of the two most costly properties, Park Place and Boardwalk, but in the 2006–2007 games the top prize ($5 million, with the traditional $1 million prize for Boardwalk/Park Place) was awarded for collecting the four railroads.

There are also "instant win" tokens the recipient can redeem for McDonald's food (typically small menu items, such as a free small McFlurry or medium fries) but never for any food item that has game pieces, money, or other prizes. The 2001 edition was titled "Pick Your Prize!", in which winners could choose which of three ways they wanted their prize awarded to them (i.e. they could choose if they wanted their $1 million in gold, diamonds, or $50,000 per year for 20 years).

In 2016, the game changed where all available prizes were cash, including the $1 million for Park Place and Boardwalk, and was titled "Money Monopoly".

Coupon pieces
Additionally, in the 2005 edition, certain foods always came with one coupon which could be used at either Best Buy, Toys R Us, or Foot Locker (including online stores). The value of each coupon was random, with Toys R Us coupons ranging from $1 to $5; up to $5 in coupons could be used in a single transaction. In 2008, these coupons were redeemed for up to 25% off any Foot Locker item(s). Since 2009, the promotion has not featured any coupons.

Canadian and US laws require that game pieces be available upon request with no purchase necessary (Alternative Method of Entry, "AMOE"), and can be requested by the mailing of a handwritten, self-addressed stamped envelope.

Unclaimed prizes
Many of the prizes stay unclaimed. For example, in 2018, 25 million instant food prizes were offered in the promotion in the UK. However, only 8 million prizes got claimed overall. Out of 20 Mini Coopers offered, only 6 got claimed.

Rare pieces in US/Canada

The rare collectible pieces that dictate the odds of winning are as follows:

Note that the rare piece is alphabetically the last property in each group, except for Boardwalk. In 2013, McDonald's allowed two Boardwalk pieces to be produced; prior to this only one was produced.

[*] Until 2007, Mediterranean and Baltic Avenues were dark purple properties on the traditional Monopoly board; since 2008, they have been brown.

[**] McDonald's added Golden Avenue and Arches Avenue for 2008 only; obtaining both won $100,000.

[***] Electric Company & Water Works were added for 2014; obtaining both won $10,000.

[****] One Free Parking $100,000 prize was seeded on each of the following in only the US Territory: Bacon Clubhouse (1 in 9,836,000), Filet-O-Fish (1 in 19,585,000), Big Mac (1 in 45,000,000) and Large Fries (1 in 150,254,000)

[*****] In 2016, the Canadian version replaced all properties with Canadian landmarks (such as replacing Boardwalk with Le Château Frontenac, and swapping Kentucky Avenue with the Confederation Bridge) and replaced all train stations with well-known Canadian airports, including Toronto Pearson International Airport and Vancouver International Airport.

Online games
In 2005, McDonald's introduced an online counterpart to its traditional game. In addition to the traditional "sticker" game, participants can play online. Each game piece lists a code which can be entered online, to a maximum of 10 entries per 24 hours, a day starts at midnight EDT. Up to 2014, each code entered grants the user one roll on a virtual Monopoly game board, identical to the board game's board. Rolling "doubles" (two dice sharing the same number), as with the real board game, allows the user to move again.

Landing on Electric Company, Income Tax, Jail/Just Visiting, Go to Jail, Water Works, or Luxury Tax does not count towards any prize. If a player lands on an unowned property (not landed upon by the player in a previous turn), the user will "collect" that property. When all properties of a colored set are collected, the user wins a prize, with prize values similar to those of the sticker game. In addition to collecting property sets, users can also win by landing on certain "instant win" spaces, including Go, Chance, Community Chest, and Free Parking. Landing on Go (but not simply passing it) gives the player a code worth one free hour of WiFi access at participating McDonald's restaurants. Landing on Chance is worth money to spend at Foot Locker. Landing on Community Chest allows the user to be given a code worth 25 My Coke Rewards points. Landing on Free Parking is a prize of a $50 refillable gas card from Shell, or alternatively 25 complimentary apple pies.

In 2007, landing on Community Chest won game downloads.

In 2009, the prizes became two hours of Wi-Fi and a $25 Arch Card for landing on Go, an entry into an online roll for $1,000,000 (annuity) for landing on Chance, 25 My Coke Rewards points for landing on Community Chest, and a $50 refillable Shell gift card for landing on Free Parking.

The values of the dice are not random. As stated in the contest rules, one property in each set is "rare," similar to the sticker game. These rare properties are landed on only when the game server "seeds" a winning roll. Winning rolls are seeded at specific times on specific dates, and the first user to roll the dice once a win has been seeded will land on a winning piece. This allows McDonald's to declare the odds of winning certain prizes, a legal requirement for contests in most jurisdictions.

In 2010, the online game was changed, removing the dice and the game board, presenting only 3 Chance cards from which to pick. One has a prize, starting at 30 My Coke Rewards points, but may be (non-randomly) seeded with a higher-valued prize. Player chooses one card, is asked if that is the choice the player wants to make, and the card is flipped. If it is the pre-selected winning card, the player wins the pre-selected prize.

In 2011, the game was changed again – the mascot, Rich Uncle Pennybags (aka "Mr. Monopoly"), is shown attempting to throw a Chance card into a top hat. If the card lands in the hat, the player can claim a prize. Players must choose a "throwing style", which only changes the animations used – it does nothing to affect one's odds of winning.

In 2012, the game was changed once more. Players must click on "Spin" first, and if it landed on "GO!", the player wins the online prize shown. The next year, players had to click on "Play"; a win resulted in the prize shown onscreen; regardless of the outcome, players received an entry to win a 2013 Fiat 500 Cabrio. For the 2014 game, players must click on "GO!", and if it results in a win, the online prize is shown onscreen; regardless of the outcome, the participant receives an entry to win $50,000.

In 2016, players can enter up to ten codes daily in order to win weekly sweepstakes with a $50,000 grand prize.

Restrictions
For all versions of the online game, players are restricted to a set number of online entries per day. In the UK, this is restricted to 24 entries. In the US, Guam, Puerto Rico, and Saipan, the limit is 10.

Players in the UK must be aged 18 years or older.

Note that the official rules state: "The purchase, sale, trading, or barter of Game Pieces, Game Stamps, FREE Codes or Game Codes via Online or live auctions, or any other methods, does not constitute Legitimate Channels and is expressly prohibited." This includes eBay.com, where it is also a violation of that site's lottery policy.

Criticism 
The promotion has been criticized for incentivizing ordering more and upsizing the portions. In 2019, Deputy Leader of the UK Labour Party, Tom Watson, said that the Monopoly promotion was a "danger to public health" and urged McDonald's to drop the "grotesque marketing strategy".

See also
Pepsi Number Fever

References

External links
 
 Commercial from 2018 Game

McDonald's advertising
Monopoly (game)
Games and sports introduced in 1987
Sales promotion